Ramster Garden is an open garden, near Chiddingfold, Surrey, covering over . First landscaped and laid out in the 1890s by Gauntlett Nurseries and Sir Harry Waechter.

In 1922, Sir Henry and Lady Norman purchased Ramster, and was cared for by their granddaughter Miranda Gunn, and her husband.

However Ramster is now shared with their daughter Rosalind Glaister.

The garden features include a flower collections, wooded areas and a woodland walk, and water features.

The house and grounds are also available for private hire for weddings and events.

References

External links
Weddings Website
Garden & Events Website
Guildford Borough Council: Ramster Garden - Profile

Botanical gardens in England
Gardens in Surrey